Baduspan I or Padusban I was the first Ispahbad and the founder of Baduspanid state. He reigned approximately from 665 to 694.

Sources 

Baduspanids
7th-century Iranian people